The Ultimate Collection is the compilation album of the Croatian rock band Aerodrom and its frontman Jurica Pađen, released through Croatia Records in April 2008. It is a double CD compilation of the greatest hits of two Pađen's bands from the eighties and nineties, Aerodrom and Pađen Band, as well as two songs from his first solo instrumental album. Pađen was the editor of the release and picked the songs for the album himself.

Track listing
All music and lyrics written by Jurica Pađen, except track 6 on disc 1, music by Remo Cartagine.

References

External links
 Official Youtube channel

Aerodrom (band) albums
2008 compilation albums
Croatia Records albums